Marai Parai or Marei Parei is a plateau on the northwestern side of Mount Kinabalu, in Malaysia. The mountain can be climbed from this side, although few parties attempt this route. The first recorded ascent of Mount Kinabalu via Marai Parai was done in 1987.

Marai Parai is a Dusun name derived from the resemblance of sedge plants, which are very common on the plateau, to hill padi.

The site is also home to several famous pitcher plant species, including Nepenthes rajah, Nepenthes burbidgeae, Nepenthes lowii, Nepenthes edwardsiana, Nepenthes fusca, and Nepenthes tentaculata. The tree Elaeocarpus inopinatus is known only from the plateau.

References

Marai Parai